The 2022 Japan Cup was the 29th edition of the Japan Cup single-day cycling race. It was held on 16 October 2022, over a distance of 144.2 km, starting and finishing in Utsunomiya.

Teams 
Five UCI WorldTeams, two UCI ProTeams, eight UCI Continental teams and the Japanese national team made up the 16 teams that participated in the race. In total, 156 riders started the race, of which 144 finished.

UCI WorldTeams

 
 
 
 
 

UCI ProTeams

 
 

UCI Continental teams

 
 
 
 
 
 
 
 

National team
 Japan

Results

References

Japan Cup
Japan Cup
Japan Cup
Japan Cup